Insect development during storage requires special consideration when further criminal investigation is necessary to solve a crime. Decomposition is a natural process of the body, dissipating slowly over time. This process is aided by insects, making the rate of decomposition faster.  For forensic entomologists, it is important to carefully collect, preserve and analyze insects found near or on a victim. By doing that, they can provide an estimated time of death as well as the manner of death and the movement of the corpse from one site to another. The role of a forensic entomologist adjunction to the pathologist is to “collect and identify the arthropods associated with such cases and to analyze entomological data for interpreting insect evidence.”

Morgue types

Bodies may be stored in coolers or refrigeration units, for various time intervals, ranging from hours to days. Two types of mortuary room may be used: positive and negative temperature morgues.

Physiological responses
Two main physiological responses to low temperature are diapause and quiescence. Diapause is a feature that insects use to synchronize their development within their life cycle with seasonal cycles of the environment. It has evolved to help insects respond to adverse environmental conditions by delaying their development. However, quiescence acts like an anesthetic, and stops insect development for a short time by slowing down insect metabolic activity. It is induced by a sudden drop in temperature that ranges from 0 °C to 10 °C. A simulation of insects chilling in a morgue was conducted by using Calliphora vicina to illustrate that adult emergence is delayed by 24 hours, no matter in which stage the refrigeration occurred. There was no mortality when they were kept at 3 °C for 24 hours. In this simulation, quiescence was induced by the low temperature and the insect physiology was not affected when they were returned to 24 °C.

Despite the result from the Calliphora vicina experimental study, refrigeration could affect post mortem interval (PMI) calculation because it may cause physiological disturbances in certain insect species. However, this refrigeration process must be done if the insects collected at the crime scene cannot be sent to a forensic entomologist immediately. Because insect development could advance after the refrigeration period, it could lead to an underestimation of the time of death.

Temperature threshold
Maggots develop at a rate that is depended entirely upon environmental factors, which makes temperature one of the most important things throughout the morgue evaluation process. Insects that are cold tolerant or warm tolerant, will have different temperatures in the body bag.  Both cold and warm tolerant maggots survive by maggot mass feeding. However, cold tolerant maggots can develop in smaller masses while warm tolerant maggots require larger masses. The maggots produce metabolic heat from bacterial digestion of the flesh, which enables them to develop while stored in a cold location. Maggot masses tend to move to thicker parts of the body that decrease in temperature more slowly. This is sufficient to continue maggot development.

Effects on corpse

Body parts with high temperatures have the greatest tissue loss from immense maggot masses. There can be extensive tissue loss in a morgue by how many maggots are present on the body and how long the body is kept in the morgue. When calculating the PMI at the autopsy, it is important to note the temperatures of the maggot masses when gathering the maggots from the body. The temperature of maggot masses in a cooler slowly decreases, which gives the minimal temperature the maggots can encounter.  There may be little or no effect of the lower temperatures on insect development if the maggot mass was well established before placing the body in the cooler. In calculating the degree-days and the life cycle from one stage to another, it is important to note how many maggots are on the body, what type of species it is due to different developmental thresholds, and the temperature and time in the cooler. For instance, the development of bluebottle blowflies is suspended at 3 °C, the common temperature of a morgue’s cold storage chamber.

Insect development during autopsy

Occasionally, when a corpse is significantly infested with insects, the exterior of the bag will consist of larvae and other adult insects. Every surface of the bag, especially the inside corners, must be carefully examined for insects that may have moved away from the body due to change in temperature when the body was removed from the death scene. It is critical that the entomologist work quickly and efficiently during the autopsy to prevent further insect development throughout the body. This will assist in calculating a correct PMI. If clothing is found on the corpse, it is gathered and evaluated for insect evidence that is then photographed with macro lenses. As the insects are gathered, a record is to be kept that explains which location of the body insects were found. This is essential when insect sampling is delayed until the time of autopsy. Therefore, it is useful to compare crime scene photos to the autopsy photos, to see changes that occurred within that time frame.

Although autopsy is typically thought of as a horrific disfigurement of the human body, it is actually an adequate procedure capable of determining a legitimate PMI, assuring medical conditions, and assisting in justifying a case that may have involved violent crime.  During an autopsy various tasks and procedures must take place, as well as proper collection of entomological evidence. Entomological evidence is usually gathered at the crime scene while the body is in situ.  This allows for a much more accurate estimation of the time of death.  If the entomological evidence is not gathered before the body is removed, then the evidence may be collected at the time of the autopsy by an entomologist or a medical examiner.  Certain insects and their life stages, within the corpse, are examined to estimate the time of death of the individual. It is critical to specify the immature stages prior to rearing them or refrigerating the body because low temperature has different effects on various stages of immaturity. A study on the effects of refrigeration on the biometry and development of Protophormia terraenovae shows that “10 days of refrigeration induced a decrease of the total developmental time of 56 and 18 hours for L1 [first stage larvae] and pre-pupae and an increase of 15 hours for L2 [second stage larvae].”

Forensic entomology today

Forensic entomology has gained a strong legitimacy in recent years for introducing vital evidence into investigations worldwide. Without the collection and preservation of insects, associated with a death scene, we could not properly estimate the time of death as well as other valuable information concerning the circumstances of the body. Human corpses, no matter the manner of death, are aided by insect decomposers. This makes the storage of the body prior to the autopsy, a vital step in the field of forensics.

Footnotes

References
Benecke, Mark. (2001). A Brief History of Forensic Entomology. Forensic Science International, Vol. 120, p. 2-14.
Catts, Paul E. and Neal H. Haskell, eds. Entomology and Death: A procedural Guide. South Carolina: Joyce’s Print Shop, Inc., 2005.
Campobasso, Carlo Pietro. and Inrona, Francesco.  The forensic entomologist in the context of the pathologist's role.  Science Direct.  10 July 2001.
Cutolo, Salvatore R.  “The Tales Dead Men Tell.” My Life In Bellevue:  Part Three 228 (1956):  30-108. Saturday Evening Post. Texas A&M Lib., College Station, TX. 20 March 2006.
Huntington, Timothy E. (2007). Maggot Development During Morgue Storage and Its Effect on Estimating the Post-Mortem Interval. Journal of Forensic Sciences, Vol. 52 Issue 2: 453-458.
Martinez, Efrain, Patricia Duque, and Marta Wolff. “Succession pattern of carrion-feeding insects in Paramo, Colombia.” Forensic Science International 166.2-3 (2007): 182-189
Myskowiak, Jean-Bernard and Claudie Doums. “Effects of refrigeration on the biometry and development of Protophormia terraenovae (Robineau-Desvoidy)(Diptera: Calliphoridae) and its consequences in estimating post-mortem interval in forensic investigations.” Forensic Science International 125.2-3 (2002): 254-261
Souder, Elaine.  “Autopsy 101 (CE).” Geriatric Nursing 24 (2003):  330-337.  Science Direct.  Texas A&M University Lib., College Station, TX. 20 March 2008.

Forensic entomology